Augusta Lindberg (17 March 1866 – 3 December 1943) was a Swedish stage actress. Lindberg also appeared in silent films, such as the 1925 historical epic Charles XII. She was married to the actor August Lindberg and was the mother of the writer Stina Bergman and the director Per Lindberg.

Filmography
 His Lordship's Last Will (1919)
 Charles XII (1925)

References

External links

Bibliography 
 Kwiatkowski, Aleksander. Swedish Film Classics. Courier Dover Publications, 2013.

1866 births
1943 deaths
Swedish stage actresses
Swedish film actresses
Swedish silent film actresses
20th-century Swedish actresses
Actresses from Stockholm
19th-century Swedish actresses